Kingsdale is a locality in the Goulburn Mulwaree Council, New South Wales, Australia. It lies about 7 km north of Goulburn and 95 km northeast of Canberra.

Kingsdale had a state public school from 1885 to 1948. This was described as a "public school" (1885–1899 and 1901–1829), "provisional school" (1929–1948) or "half-time school" (1899–1901 and 1929).

References

Goulburn Mulwaree Council
Localities in New South Wales
Southern Tablelands